Otter-Orloff Lakes Wildland Provincial Park is a wildland provincial park in northern Alberta, Canada. The park is included in the Upper Athabasca Region Land Use Framework. The park surrounds Orloff Lake and Otter Lake is named for the two lakes contained within the park.

Location
There is no direct road access to the park.

Ecology 
The park protects an example of the Central Mixedwood subregion of the Boreal Forest natural region of Alberta. In the National Ecological Framework for Canada used by Environment and Climate Change Canada, the park is in the Cross Lake Upland ecodistrict of the Mid-Boreal Uplands ecoregion in the Central Boreal Plains ecoprovince of the Boreal Plains Ecozone. Under the OneEarth classification (previously World Wildlife Fund), the park is in the Mid-Canada Boreal Plains Forests ecoregion of the Mid-Canada Boreal Plains & Foothill Forests bioregion.

Geography 
The park is flat except for the fringes where it climbs the slopes on nearby hills.

Climate 
The Köppen climate classification of the park is Continental, Subarctic (Dfc) characterized by long, cold winters, and short, warm to cool summers.

Natural history themes 
Old grow forests in the park are dominated by white spruce and balsam fir. The mature forests contain birch and balsam poplar. The younger forests in the park contain white spruce and aspen. Wetlands contain black spruce and larch. The lakes contain perch, Northern pike, walleye, and lake whitefish. They also provide habitat for beaver, muskrat and waterfowl. There is a great blue heron colony on Orloff Lake.

Activities 
There are no developed facilities in the park so only random backcountry camping is permitted. Wildlife Viewing and backcountry hiking are also available. On the lakes, power boating, canoeing, and kayaking can be enjoyed in the park. all-terrain vehicles in summer and snowmobiles in winter are permitted. Hunting and fishing are permitted when licensed.

See also 
 List of provincial parks in Alberta
 List of Canadian provincial parks

References

External links 
 

Parks in Alberta
Provincial parks of Alberta